Liberty Township is a township in Decatur County, Kansas, USA.  As of the 2000 census, its population was 48.

Geography
The county seat of Oberlin sits on the township's southeastern border.

Transportation
Liberty Township contains two airports or landing strips: Oberlin Municipal Airport and R and D Aerial Spraying Airport.

References
 USGS Geographic Names Information System (GNIS)

External links
 US-Counties.com
 City-Data.com

Townships in Decatur County, Kansas
Townships in Kansas